Catherine Have (born 16 November 1995) is a Luxembourger footballer who plays as a midfielder for Dames Ligue 1 team Entente Wormeldingen-Munsbach-CSG and the Luxembourg women's national team.

Club career
Have has played for Canach-Remich/Bous, SG Lintgen and Wormeldingen-Munsbach-CSG in Luxembourg.

International career
Have made her senior debut for Luxembourg on 20 March 2013 during a 1–1 friendly draw against Estonia.

References

1995 births
Living people
Luxembourgian women's footballers
Women's association football midfielders
Luxembourg women's international footballers